Lonwabo Owen Mvimbi (birth 5 Jan 1988)  is a South African field hockey player who plays for the South African national team.

Club career
Current club Jeppe

International career
Mvimbi made his South Africa debut when he played in the test at Germany. He earned his 50th test cap in Namibia. He competed in the 2020 Africa Cup of Nations and 2018 Commonwealth Games.

References

External links

1988 births
Living people
South African male field hockey players
Field hockey players at the 2018 Commonwealth Games
University of Johannesburg alumni
21st-century South African people